Oculocornia is a monotypic genus of Asian dwarf spiders containing the single species, Oculocornia orientalis. It was first described by T. I. Oliger in 1985, and has only been found in Russia.

See also
 List of Linyphiidae species (I–P)

References

Linyphiidae
Monotypic Araneomorphae genera
Spiders of Russia